Snowplanet is an indoor snow recreation centre in Silverdale on the Hibiscus Coast in New Zealand. 

Snowplanet is New Zealand's first indoor snow facility and began working in March 2005. It lies 29 minutes (35 km) north of Auckland city. The snow dome, approximately 40 × 200 m and built on the side of a hill, features 50 centimeters of real snow (man-made), three tows, a terrain park for freestyle skiers and snowboarders and a separate learners slope.  It has thrilling Snow activities like Snow slides, Snow play area, and Snow dance floor.

The company offers ski rentals and lessons, offers a wide range of programs for all abilities and offers group bookings for schools and businesses. It also has a small store that sells gloves, helmets and socks and offers a range of off-snow services, including; a restaurant & licensed bar, meeting and conference facilities.

References

 From The Mouths Of Sporting Greats (26 April 2005).
 We check out Snow Planet (14 March 2005).
 Cool Business (2005).
 Snowplanet opens in New Zealand (7 December 2017).

External links
 

Sports venues in the Auckland Region
Rodney Local Board Area
Indoor ski resorts
Artificial ski resorts